Area code 758 is the local telephone area code of Saint Lucia.  The 758 area code, or "(SLU)" was created during a split from the original 809 area code which began permissive dialing on 1 July 1996 and ended 1 January 1997.

When in Saint Lucia, use the seven digits alone. When calling to Saint Lucia from anywhere in the United States or Canada simply dial 1 (758) + seven digit phone number.

See also

List of NANP area codes
North American Numbering Plan
Area codes in the Caribbean

References
 758

External links
National Telecommunications Regulatory Commission (Saint Lucia)
Eastern Caribbean Telecommunications Authority (ECTEL)
North American Numbering Plan Administrator (NANPA)
 List of exchanges from AreaCodeDownload.com, 758 Area Code

758
Communications in Saint Lucia